The Italo-Svevo-Preis is a German literary prize  which has been awarded to outstanding German-language authors since 2001. The prize, named after Italo Svevo, is endowed with 15,000 euros and is made possible by the Hamburg issuing house . Until 2011, a juror appointed by the board of trustees alone decided who would be honoured with the prize. Since 2013, a three-member jury with a changing composition has awarded the prize.

The Italo Svevo Prize honours "literary varieties of aesthetic obstinacy", according to the prize donor. The prize promotes and honours the work of a German-language author, which has become visible in at least three independent publications and which, in the opinion of the juror, still lacks due public recognition and broad attention. The award is given for achievements in the field of prose: novel, essay, literary reportage or experimental forms of storytelling. 

Award winners 

 2001: Kathrin Röggla
 2002: Alois Hotschnig
 2003: Hartmut Lange
 2004: Eckhard Henscheid
 2005: Jürg Laederach
 2006: Rosa Pock
 2007: Gerd Fuchs
 2008: Marie-Luise Scherer
 2009: Annette Pehnt
 2011: Volker H. Altwasser
 2013: Giwi Margwelaschwili
 2014: Jochen Missfeldt.
 2015: Nina Jäckle
 2016: Sabine Peters
 2017: Zsuzsanna Gahse
 2018: Jan Faktor
 2019: Patricia Görg

See also 
 List of literary awards

References

External links 
 Italo-Svevo-Preis auf literaturport.de, retrieved 5 January 2021.

German literary awards
Awards established in 1961